The Inertial Upper Stage (IUS), originally designated the Interim Upper Stage, was a two-stage, solid-fueled space launch system developed by Boeing for the United States Air Force beginning in 1976 for raising payloads from low Earth orbit to higher orbits or interplanetary trajectories following launch aboard a Titan 34D or Titan IV rocket as its upper stage, or from the payload bay of the Space Shuttle as a space tug.

Development
During the development of the Space Shuttle, NASA, with support from the Air Force, wanted an upper stage that could be used on the Shuttle to deliver payloads from low earth orbit to higher energy orbits such as GTO or GEO or to escape velocity for planetary probes. The candidates were the Centaur, propelled by liquid hydrogen and liquid oxygen, the Transtage, propelled by hypergolic storable propellants Aerozine-50 and dinitrogen tetroxide, and the Interim Upper Stage, using solid propellant. The DOD reported that Transtage could support all defense needs but could not meet NASA's scientific requirements, the IUS could support most defense needs and some science missions, while the Centaur could meet all needs of both the Air Force and NASA. Development began on both the Centaur and the IUS, and a second stage was added to the IUS design which could be used either as an apogee kick motor for inserting payloads directly into geostationary orbit or to increase the payload mass brought to escape velocity. 

Boeing was the primary contractor for the IUS while Chemical Systems Division of United Technologies built the IUS solid rocket motors.

The first launch of the IUS was in 1982 on a Titan 34D rocket from the Cape Canaveral Air Force Station shortly before the STS-6 Space Shuttle mission. 

Development of the Shuttle-Centaur was halted after the Challenger disaster, and the Interim Upper Stage became the Inertial Upper Stage.

Design
The solid rocket motor on both stages had a steerable nozzle for thrust vectoring. The second stage had hydrazine reaction control jets for attitude control whilst coasting, and for separation from payload. Depending on mission, one, two or three  tanks of hydrazine could be fitted.

Applications

On Titan launches, the Titan booster would launch the IUS, carrying the payload into low Earth orbit where it was separated from the Titan and ignited its first stage, which carried it into an elliptical "transfer" orbit to a higher altitude. 

On Shuttle launches, the orbiter's payload bay was opened, the IUS and its payload raised (by the IUS Airborne Support Equipment (ASE)) to a 50-52° angle, and released. After the Shuttle separated from the payload to a safe distance, the IUS first stage ignited and, as on a Titan booster mission, entered a "transfer orbit". 

Upon reaching apogee in the transfer orbit, the first stage and interstage structure were jettisoned. The second stage then fired to circularize the orbit, after which it released the satellite and, using its attitude control jets, began a retrograde maneuver to enter a lower orbit to avoid any possibility of collision with its payload.

In addition to the communication and reconnaissance missions described above, which placed the payload into stationary (24-hour) orbit, the IUS was also used to boost spacecraft towards planetary trajectories. For these missions, the second IUS stage was separated and ignited immediately after first stage burnout. Igniting the second stage at low altitude (and thus, high orbital speed) provided the extra velocity the spacecraft needed to escape from Earth orbit (see Oberth effect). IUS could not impart as much velocity to its payload as Centaur would have been able to: while Centaur could have launched Galileo directly on a two-year trip to Jupiter, the IUS required a six-year voyage with multiple gravity assists.

The final flight of the IUS occurred in February 2004.

Flights

Gallery

References

External links
 Evolution of the Inertial Upper Stage Crosslink Winter 2003 Vol 4 Num 1 (published by The Aerospace Corporation), page 38
 Inertial Upper Stage at Federation of American Scientists

Expendable space launch systems
Rocket stages
Space Shuttle program